The 2011 Torneo Internacional AGT was a professional tennis tournament played on hard courts. It was the ninth edition of the tournament which was part of the 2011 ATP Challenger Tour. It took place in León, Mexico between April 25 – May 1, 2011.

ATP entrants

Seeds

 Rankings are as of April 18, 2011.

Other entrants
The following players received wildcards into the singles main draw:
  Juan-Manuel Elizondo
  Fernando Larrea
  César Ramírez
  Manuel Sánchez

The following players received entry from the qualifying draw:
  Jamie Baker
  Chris Eaton
  Christopher Díaz Figueroa
  Nikolaus Moser

Champions

Singles

 Bobby Reynolds def.  Andre Begemann, 6–3, 6–3

Doubles

 Rajeev Ram /  Bobby Reynolds def.  Andre Begemann /  Chris Eaton, 6–3, 6–2

External links
ITF Search
ATP official site

Torneo Internacional AGT
Torneo Internacional Challenger León
2011 in Mexican tennis